Lars Jansson (born 1951) is a Swedish jazz pianist and composer.

Life
Jansson grew up in Örebro, Sweden, where he was bored by his lessons at the community music school. In his early teens, a relative lent him records of Miles Davis, Ben Webster, and Mose Allison. During the 1960s, he followed the fashion and developed an interest in the organ. He listened to Kjell Öhman play with the Telstars, to Jimmy Smith and Jack McDuff, and to Hammond organ music. Drummer Sjunne Ferger became an important figure in his life, and together they formed a duo: "Takt & Ton" (Beat & Pitch).

In 1970, after graduation from upper secondary school, he took a semester off, planning to go on and study medicine. He ended up at dental school, but after a year and a half he decided to switch to music. He was accepted at the Göteborg College of Music, where all the professional musicians had their jam sessions at night. That gave him the opportunity to play with Ove Johansson, Jan Forslund, Conny Sjökvist, Gilbert Holmström, Gunnar Lindgren, and others, and he discovered Herbie Hancock, McCoy Tyner, Paul Bley, Bill Evans, Lennie Tristano, Keith Jarrett, and Chick Corea.

Lars became a member of Björn Alke's quartet, with Gunnar Bergsten. He also played with the Arild Andersen Quartet. He went on to play with Radka Toneff and various Norwegian musicians, including Knut Riisnaes and Jan Garbarek, and then with Hawk On Flight, Equinox, Red Mitchell, Joakim Milder, Crystal Eagle, and many other groups, both Swedish and Danish. Today, the Lars Jansson trio is, and has long been, one of the most well-renowned jazz groups in Sweden. Originally, the other two members were Anders Jormin and Anders Kjellberg. Lars Danielsson succeeded Jormin as the trio's bass player in the mid-1980s, and since January 2005 he has been succeeded by Christian Spering.
Lars Jansson Trios member are now Thomas Fonnesbaek-bass (Copenhagen) and his son Paul Svanberg (Stockholm) on drums.

Discography

As leader

Compilations
Ballads (Imogena, 1991–97)

As sideman
With Arild Andersen
Shimri (ECM, 1976)
Green Shading into Blue (ECM, 1978)
With Hans Ulrik
Strange World (STUNT, 1994)
With Ove Ingemarsson

 Heart of the Matter 

 New Blues

Gallery

References

External links
 Official site

1951 births
Living people
Swedish composers
Swedish male composers
Jazz fusion pianists
Swedish pianists
Swedish jazz pianists
Male pianists
21st-century pianists
21st-century Swedish male musicians
Male jazz musicians
Storyville Records artists